Within molecular and cell biology, p87PIKAP is a regulatory subunit of the type IB Phosphoinositide 3-Kinase p110γ that is highly expressed in the heart and is present in dendritic cells, macrophages, and neutrophils.
It is also referred to as p84 and p87. Some studies have found P87PIKAP to have a role in carcinogenesis.

References